Chiclayo District is one of twenty districts of the Chiclayo province in Peru. The district is home to the principal city of Chiclayo.

References

See also 
 Administrative divisions of Peru